Iccius is a genus of beetles belonging to the family Tenebrionidae.

The species of this genus are found in America.

Species:
 Iccius cephalotes Champion, 1886 
 Iccius cylindricus Champion, 1886

References

Tenebrionidae
Tenebrionidae genera